The Foundation is the seventh and final studio album by hip hop group Geto Boys, released in 2005. It is their second group reunification album since The Resurrection in 1996. Its only credited guest appearance comes from Z-Ro and it has production by Tone Capone, Mike Dean, Scarface, Mr. Mixx and Cory Mo. It did fairly well commercially, reaching #19 on the Billboard 200 chart. The two singles released that did not chart were "G-Code/When It Gets Gangsta/The Secret" and "Yes, Yes, Y'All". The latter was used on EA Sports's Fight Night Round 2 and on 25 to Life. The instrumental to "G-Code" was used in a Chrysler 300 commercial featuring Ndamukong Suh.

Track listing

Singles

Charts

Weekly charts

Year-end charts

References

2005 albums
Geto Boys albums
Rap-A-Lot Records albums
Albums produced by Mike Dean (record producer)